Cerro Tres Kandú or Cerro Peró (Tres Kandu or Perõ in the Guaraní language) is the highest point in Paraguay, with an elevation of 842 meters (2,762 ft). It is located in the municipality of General Eugenio Garay, Guairá Department, in a hill range named Ybytyruzú.

This hill was important for the Armed Forces of Paraguay because it was a strategic location to place the army repeater or radio-link for their communication. The national electrical company (ANDE) had also mounted its radiocommunication repeater on this hill. Today these installations are abandoned.

See also
 Geography of Paraguay
 List of elevation extremes by country

References

External links
 "Cerro Peró, Paraguay" on Peakbagger

Hills of Paraguay
Guairá Department
Highest points of countries